Moise is a given name and   surname, with differing spellings in its French and Romanian origins, both of which originate from the name Moses: Moïse is the French spelling of Moses, while Moise is the Romanian spelling. As a surname, Moisè and Mosè are Italian spellings of Moses.

Given name

Moise
 Moise of Wallachia (died 1530), Romanian prince
 Moise Crăciun (born 1927), Romanian skier
 Moise Fokou (born 1985), American football linebacker
 Moise Movilă (1596–1661), Prince of Moldavia
 Moise Poida (born 1978), Vanuatuan footballer
 Moise Pomaney (born 1945), Ghanaian long-jumper
 Moise Safra (1935–2014), Brazilian businessman and founder of Banco Safra
 Moise Kean (born 2000), Italian footballer

Moïse
 Moïse Amyraut (1596–1664), French theologian
 Moïse Brou Apanga (born 1982), Côte d'Ivoire born Gabonese footballer
 Moïse Bambara (born 1984), German-Burkinabé footballer
 Moïse de Camondo (1860–1935), French banker
 Moïse Fortier (1815–1877), Quebec businessman
 Moïse Houde (1811–1885), Quebec politician
 Moise Joseph (born 1981), Haitian middle-distance runner
 Moïse Kandé (born 1978), Mauritanian footballer
 Moïse Katumbi (born 1964), governor of the Katanga province in the DRC
 Moïse Kisling (1891–1953), Polish-Jewish French painter
 Moïse Lévy de Benzion (1873–1943), Egyptian Jewish department store owner and art collector
 Moïse Plante (1830–1892), Quebec merchant and politician
 Moïse Rahmani (1944–2016), Egyptian-born Belgian-Congo then Belgian Jewish author
 Moïse Schwab (1839–1918), French librarian
 Moïse Tshombe (1919–1969), president of Katanga and prime minister of the DRC
 Moïse Vauquelin (fl. 1650–1670), French buccaneer

Surname

Moise
 Cilibi Moise (1812–1870), Romanian Jewish humorist
 Edwin E. Moise (1918–1988), American mathematician
 Patty Moise (born 1960), American NASCAR driver
 Romario Moise (born 1996), Romanian footballer
 Rudy Moise (born 1954), retired colonel in the United States Air Force, doctor, lawyer, politician, entrepreneur and actor
 William Moise (1922–1980), American painter

Moïse
 Edwin Warren Moïse (1810–1868), Jewish-American physician and Judge in the Confederate States of America of French-Haitian descent
 Edwin Warren Moïse (born 1832) (1832–1902), Jewish-American lawyer, politician, and military officer of the Confederate States Army
 Jean-Charles Moïse (born 1967), Haitian politician
 Jovenel Moïse (1968–2021), Haitian politician and president of Haiti
 Lenelle Moïse (born 1980), Haitian actress
 Martine Moïse (born 1974), first lady of Haiti
 Penina Moïse (1797–1880), American poet of French-Jewish descent
 Teri Moïse (1970–2013), Haitian-American singer

Others
 Roch Thériault (1947–2011), Canadian cult leader and convicted murderer, self-proclaimed prophet under the name Moïse

See also
 Moyse, a given name and surname

French-language surnames
French masculine given names
Romanian-language surnames
Romanian masculine given names